KettleHouse Brewing Company is a craft brewing company located in Missoula, Montana. Founded in 1995 by Tim O'Leary and Suzy Rizza, the company has grown from a single taproom to two taprooms in Missoula and a major production facility in Bonner, Montana on the Blackfoot River. In 2017, the company, in collaboration with Top Hat Entertainment, opened the KettleHouse Amphitheater near the new facility in Bonner.

History 
Founders Tim O'Leary and Suzy Rizza discovered a growing community of craft brewers while living in Colorado in the 1990s and began brewing beer. After experimenting with homebrewing in their kitchen, they quickly moved their production to a brew-on-premises in Boulder. The couple moved to Montana and opened the first brew on premise in Missoula, with the state only requiring them to obtain a brewer's license. They established KettleHouse with the idea of beer and recyclable packaging as a guiding point for success.

In 2006, KettleHouse became the first brewer in Montana to can its beer, fulfilling O'Leary's original goal of an environmentally friendly brewhouse. After occupying its original Myrtle Street location since opening, the canning required a move to a bigger facility to accommodate higher production numbers and larger equipment. Moving into a Northside location in 2009, the company did not think they would reach the production limit as laid out by the state of Montana. Despite two facilities working at full production, the company could not meet demand for their product and still remain under the 10,000 barrel cap. Starting in 2012, the company began to move out of markets in response to the demand in the Missoula area. O'Leary stated he was unwilling to "close down our taprooms and risk alienating ourselves from our core market", but that he hoped he could help "remove this 10K (barrel) hurdle", (something he had helped put in place in 1999) and increase the barrel limit. In 2017, the increase in barrel production limits O'Leary sought was passed in the Montana State Legislature. Production limits were raised to 60,000 barrels with a 2,000 barrel limit on taproom sales for breweries in Montana.

In 2017, KettleHouse expanded outside beer production and its related products for the first time. In January 2017, the company opened a brand new canning and brewing facility in Bonner to prepare for the increase in barrels allowed as passed in the legislature. The new facility has the ability to brew 30,000 barrels per year, surpassing the production of both other taprooms. In the summer of 2017, KettleHouse opened the new KettleHouse Amphitheater in Bonner, Montana with inaugural act Lyle Lovett.

Products 
KettleHouse has four mainstay beers available at its tap houses: Cold Smoke Scotch Ale, Double Haul IPA, Eddy Out Pale Ale and Fresh Bongwater Hemp Ale. Cold Smoke is KettleHouse's best seller and most awarded beer with four Golds at the North American Beer Awards as well as a popular ice cream version served in Missoula. Bongwater Hemp Ale attracted some controversy with its initial offering that culminated with an investigation by the Bureau of Alcohol, Tobacco, Firearms and Explosives.

Seasonals 
In addition to its mainstays, the brewery offers a rotating selection of seasonals that differ based on the tap house and the time of year. Some of the more popular offerings are the Garden City Pale Ale and the various cask aged beers released throughout the year. Included at the tap houses are nitro-served beers, with Cold Smoke on nitro being a popular choice by consumers as it creates a smoother drink. Te Bonner Lager, a beer designed to be consumed at the KettleHouse Amphitheater was brewed to celebrate the venue's opening in 2017.

See also 
 List of breweries in Montana

References

Bibliography 
 Cederberg, Jenna."Local demand forces Kettlehouse to remove products from Kalispell…" The Missoulian, Mar 4, 2012. http://missoulian.com/news/local/local-demand-forces-kettlehouse-to-remove-products-from-kalispell-helena/article_d565bb08-64f0-11e1-88c3-001871e3ce6c.html
 Eaton, Joe. "Missoula Taps the Power of Beer."City Lab, Aug 3, 2017. https://www.citylab.com/life/2017/08/missoula-taps-the-power-of-beer/535800/
 Moore, Michael. Olde Bongwater has State Crime Lab all abuzz." The Missoulian, Dec 12, 1999. http://missoulian.com/uncategorized/olde-bongwater-beer-has-state-crime-lab-all-abuzz/article_988667de-1fa0-568d-9b85-8cefb561946f.html
 Newhouse, Ryan. Montana Beer: A Guide to Breweries in Big Sky Country. Charleston, SC: American Palate, 2013.
 Nickell, Joe. "Kettlehouse, Big Dipper Team Up to Make Coldsmoke Beer Ice Cream." The Missoulian, Sept,17 2009. http://missoulian.com.weblib.lib.umt.edu:8080/news/local/kettlehouse-big-dipper-team-up-to-create-cold-smoke-beer/article_2112e0e4-a40f-11de-9713-001cc4c002e0.html
 Tabish, Dillion.,"Legislature Approves Bill Raising Brewery Production Limits," Flathead Beacon, Apr 13, 2017. http://flatheadbeacon.com/2017/04/13/legislature-approves-bill-raising-brewery-production-limits/

Beer brewing companies based in Montana
1995 establishments in Montana
Companies based in Missoula, Montana
American companies established in 1995